Ram Chander Jangra is an Indian politician. He was elected to the Rajya Sabha (the upper house of Indian Parliament) from Haryana, as a member of the Bharatiya Janata Party.

References

Living people
Rajya Sabha members from Haryana
Bharatiya Janata Party politicians from Haryana
Year of birth missing (living people)